Teo Kok Siang (born 26 August 1990) is a former Malaysian badminton player. In 2008, he won the gold medals at the Asian and World Junior Championships in the boys' doubles partnered with Mak Hee Chun. In 2013, he reach the semi final round at the Southeast Asian Games partnered with Goh V Shem but was defeated by the Indonesian pair, and they settled for bronze. In 2015, he submitted his resignation letters to the Badminton Association of Malaysia (BAM), and started to play as an independent player. Currently, he is the assistant coach for Malaysia mixed doubles national team.

Achievements

Southeast Asian Games 
Men's doubles

BWF World Junior Championships 
Boys' doubles

Asian Junior Championships 
Boys' doubles

BWF International Challenge/Series 
Men's doubles

  BWF International Challenge tournament
  BWF International Series tournament

References

External links 
 

Living people
1990 births
People from Johor
Malaysian sportspeople of Chinese descent
Malaysian male badminton players
Competitors at the 2013 Southeast Asian Games
Competitors at the 2015 Southeast Asian Games
Southeast Asian Games bronze medalists for Malaysia
Southeast Asian Games medalists in badminton
21st-century Malaysian people